KF A&N is a professional football club from Kosovo which competes in the Second League. The club is based in Prizren. Their home ground is the Përparim Thaçi Stadium, which has a seating capacity of 10,000. In 2020, A&N got promoted to the Liga e Parë.

Players

Current squad

See also
 List of football clubs in Kosovo

References

Football clubs in Kosovo
Association football clubs established in 2017
Sport in Prizren